Langnes Peninsula is a narrow rocky peninsula in Antarctica. The name derives from "Langneset" (the long point), applied by the Lars Christensen Expedition (1936–37) which mapped the peninsula from aerial photographs.

References

Peninsulas of Antarctica
Landforms of Princess Elizabeth Land
Ingrid Christensen Coast